Gary Thomas Scott (born August 22, 1968), is an American former Major League Baseball third baseman who played for the Chicago Cubs in 1991 and 1992.

A native of New Rochelle, New York, Scott attended Pelham Memorial High School. At Pelham, he was the basketball team's all-time leading scorer and the quarterback of the football team. He received no scholarship offers to play college baseball but received several scholarship offers from NCAA Division I basketball programs. It was during a recruiting trip to Drexel that he decided to contact the baseball coach at nearby Villanova University about walking on to the baseball team.

He played college baseball at Villanova, where he was named to the 1989 Big East Conference baseball tournament all-tournament team. In 1987, he played collegiate summer baseball with the Wareham Gatemen of the Cape Cod Baseball League, and returned to the league in 1988 to play for the Falmouth Commodores. He was selected by the Chicago Cubs in the second round of the 1989 MLB Draft.

In each of his two major league seasons, Scott was the opening day third baseman for Chicago, but in each case he was back in the minor leagues within a few weeks.  In 1991, Scott batted .165 until May 14, when the Cubs sent him down.  On April 20, 1992, he was batting .103 when he cracked a grand slam at Wrigley Field.  He was then sent down three games later.  Scott was called up a few more times during that year but never reached the majors again, continuing to play in the minor leagues until  before retiring.

References

External links

1968 births
Living people
Baseball players from New York (state)
Chicago Cubs players
Falmouth Commodores players
Major League Baseball third basemen
Sportspeople from New Rochelle, New York
Villanova Wildcats baseball players
Wareham Gatemen players
American expatriate baseball players in Mexico
Charlotte Knights players
Geneva Cubs players
Indianapolis Indians players
Iowa Cubs players
Langosteros de Quintana Roo players
Las Vegas Stars (baseball) players
Phoenix Firebirds players
Portland Beavers players
Richmond Braves players
Winston-Salem Spirits players